Ugweno (or Vughonu to its inhabitants) is located within the Mwanga District, Kilimanjaro Region, Tanzania, Africa. It is situated at 3° 39' 0" South and 37° 39' 0" East in the Pare Mountains. The people who live in Ugweno are known as Wagweno (or Vaghonu to its inhabitants) and their common language is Kigweno (or Kighonu to its inhabitants).

History  
The original inhabitants of this area are the Shana clan (or clan of blacksmiths). Even the name Ugweno is derived from a notably popular Shana ruler, known as Mghonu, who ruled somewhere between the 13th and 15th century. A precise date is hard to establish given 'the great Shana disruption' when they were deposed of their rule. During his rule, the area was known as the Mountains of Mghonu as far afield as the Taita region in Kenya.

When the Suya clan migrated to the region; ambushed and wiped out almost all of the Shana clan, the origins of the name Ugweno was either less known or purposely forgotten by the new rulers. This led to various theories that claimed origins of this name. Some have claimed it was derived from Taita and Voi tribes from Kenya during the migration to the Pare Mountains due to tribal wars in their Kenyan homelands. Before they established settlements in the Pare mountains, they first sent explorers. When the explorers returned to give feedback, they said Mringa ua khona, meaning the rivers produce thunder when flowing, and the name Ugweno was allegedly born.

The Suya clan was responsible for the expansion of the state of Ugweno. Post 16th century, this state stretched as far south as Lembeni at its peak and is known as one of the great centralized political administration systems for indigenous communities in Tanzania. 

The present day Gweno people are a mixture of all those who came to make the beautiful mountains of Ugweno their home. Historically, their ancestors came from Taita, Voi, Chaga, as well as Southern Pare tribes. This is why present-day Gweno families trace their roots from various areas, such as the Suya, Sangi and Nzava families. A good example are the Odongo (and others) who were called by the Suya from the Nguru mountain region of Tanzania to prevent conflicts in Ugweno.

Tradition food  

Kirembwe is their main dish - a mixture of banana and beans. The mixture is cooked using a clay port. It can be crushed to create a hard porridge that looks like a cake when it cools. Kirembwe is normally prepared for breakfast. Sometimes the mixture is ground and water added to it, making it porridge-like, this is what is commonly eaten as Kiumbo.

Economic 

The area's chief produce is coffee and banana. The area also produces maize and rice which is grown in the swampy plains.

Tourism attraction  

Ugweno is situated in the Pare Mountains with a clear picture of Mount Kilimanjaro and the beautiful Lake Jipe. This lake is an inter-territorial lake straddling the borders of Tanzania and Kenya. On the Tanzanian side, it is situated within Ugweno while on the Kenyan side, it is located south of the village of Nghonji.  The lake receives water from North Pare mountain streams as well as Lumi River, which descends from Mount Kilimanjaro. The lake's outlet forms the Ruvu River. The lake's shores are protected by the Tsavo West National Park and Mkomazi Game Reserve nearby. The lake is known for its endemic fish, as well as water birds, mammals, wetland plants and lake-edge swamps, which can extend for about 2 kilometres (1.2 mi) from Lake Jipe's shore.

References

Populated places in Kilimanjaro Region